The Torneo de Copa 2018-2019 is a soccer tournament by direct elimination that is played every season among the 10 clubs of the Liga Panameña de Fútbol; 10 clubs of the Liga Nacional de Ascenso and the champions and runners-up of the Provincial Leagues (Copa Rommel Fernández).

With this Cup tournament, in its third edition, the Panamanian Football Federation seeks to bring national football to all corners of the country and promote competition between teams at all levels to perform a qualitative analysis of what is the true level of the Panama|nian football, in addition to offering the opportunity to enjoy in the first person the largest football teams in the country to the fans of the provinces that usually do not have the opportunity to do so.

Participating teams 

Participate in the  'Torneo de Copa 2018-2019'  a total of 44 Clubs: 10 Clubs of the Liga Panameña de Fútbol, 10 Clubs of the Liga Nacional de Ascenso as well as the champions and runners-up teams of the Provincial Leagues, 24 in total.

Panamanian Football League (LPF) 

Liga Panameña de Fútbol